Papyrus 48 (Gregory-Aland), signed by 𝔓48, is an early copy of a part of the New Testament in Greek. It is a papyrus manuscript of the Acts of the Apostles, it contains portions of Acts 23:11-29.
The manuscript paleographically has been assigned to the 3rd century.

Although the text of this codex is extremely small, the Greek text of this codex has been called a representative of the Western text-type. Aland placed it in Category IV.

It is currently housed at the Laurentian Library (PSI 1165) in Florence.

See also 

 List of New Testament papyri

References

Further reading 

 G. Vitelli and S. G. Mercati, Papiri greci e latini della Società Italiana X, (1932), pp. 112–118.

Images 
 Image 𝔓48 verso 
 Image 𝔓48 reverso

External links 

 Robert B. Waltz. NT Manuscripts: Papyri, Papyri 𝔓48 Encyclopedia of Textual Criticism

New Testament papyri
3rd-century biblical manuscripts
Early Greek manuscripts of the New Testament
Acts of the Apostles papyri